Kanak Asha "Konnie" Huq (born 17 July 1975) is a British television and radio presenter, screenwriter and children's author. She became the longest-serving female presenter of the British children's television programme Blue Peter, presenting it from 1997 to 2008. She has been a presenter and guest of  shows including the 2010 series of The Xtra Factor on ITV2.

She co-wrote the Black Mirror episode "Fifteen Million Merits" with her husband, Charlie Brooker. Her children's book Cookie and the Most Annoying Boy in the World was published in 2019. She published the follow-up, Cookie and the Most Annoying Girl in the World, in 2020 along with her third children's book, Fearless Fairy Tales: The Perfect Book for Homeschooling Fun and Inspiration.

Early life
Kanak Asha Huq was born in the Hammersmith district of London on 17 July 1975, the daughter of Muslim parents who emigrated from Bangladesh in the 1960s. She grew up in the Ealing district of London with her two elder sisters, Nutun, and future Labour Party politician Rupa. She attended Notting Hill & Ealing High School and obtained nine GCSEs, then gained A-levels in chemistry, mathematics, and physics. She went on to study economics at Robinson College, Cambridge, graduating with a 2:1 degree.

Career

Early work
Huq trained part-time at the National Youth Music Theatre. In 1989, at the age of 14, she appeared with them on Blue Peter and sang a solo. The following year, she appeared alongside Jude Law in Captain Stirrick, a National Youth Music Theatre production.

Before the 1992 general election, Huq interviewed Labour leader Neil Kinnock for the children's programme Newsround, and appeared as a contestant on Blockbusters in the same year. She appeared as an uncredited extra playing a schoolgirl in the BBC1 sitcom 2point4 Children in the Series 2 episode "I'm Going Slightly Mad".

Her presenting debut, at the age of 16, was on the satellite television show, TVFM. She then appeared on a GMTV Saturday morning children's quiz show entitled Eat Your Words between 1994 and 1996. She was assisted by Mark Speight before Simon Parkin took over. In 1997, several months before joining Blue Peter, Huq presented Channel Five's early morning children's programme Milkshake!

Blue Peter
Huq presented the BBC children's television programme Blue Peter, starting on 1 December 1997. Early in her term as a presenter, she visited the village in Bangladesh where earlier generations of her family lived. In the programme's 2004 Summer Expedition to India, Huq became an extra in the Bollywood film Musafir (2004), and practised dancing alongside its stars. For the programme's 2004 Welcome Home appeal, she visited Angola, hoping to reunite children and their families who had been separated due to war. In 2008, during her last programme, she broke a Guinness World Record by pinning 17 Blue Peter Badges onto fellow presenter Andy Akinwolere's shirt in a minute. In March 2007, she apologised on air on behalf of the programme to viewers, after the result of a competition to identify the celebrity owner of a pair of shoes was faked.

On 31 May 2007, Huq announced she would be leaving Blue Peter. On 22 January 2008, she hosted her final Blue Peter, with a clip show of her highlights through the ten years she had been on the programme. She is the third longest-serving Blue Peter presenter and its longest-serving female host, having passed Valerie Singleton's record on 1 October 2007. She holds the record for working with the most co-presenters while on the show, with a total of 10. These are Stuart Miles, Katy Hill, Romana D'Annunzio, Richard Bacon, Simon Thomas, Matt Baker, Liz Barker, Zoe Salmon, Gethin Jones and Andy Akinwolere.

Other work

Presenting and panel shows

Between 2002 and 2004, Huq co-presented the CBBC Channel's UK Top 40 chart show and in early 2003 she was briefly a presenter for Top of the Pops. She presented GMTV's LK today coverage of New York Fashion Week on the week of 10 September 2007. In June 2007 she was a guest panellist on the comedy gameshow 8 out of 10 Cats.

In December 2007, Huq appeared on a celebrity version of Ready Steady Cook with Blue Peter co-presenter Andy Akinwolere. She began presenting the ITV1 London show London Talking, a political debate show, alongside Vanessa Feltz and Nick Ferrari in 2007, and co-presented some of the weekly Your News programmes for BBC News in 2008. Huq was the main presenter for the third series, in 2008, of Channel Five show Zoo Days, a documentary series about the animals and staff at Chester and Colchester Zoos. Huq presented The Red Bull Air Race with Dougie Anderson for Channel 4 in 2008.

Huq appeared with her future husband Charlie Brooker in his satirical review programme Screenwipe in December 2008 on BBC Four. She hosted a mock version of a "mission documentary" entitled Konnie's Great British Wee. She was a guest on political show This Week on 18 December 2008, appearing with M.P. Charles Kennedy.

She presented Guinness World Records Smashed with Steve Jones on Sundays on Sky1 in 2009. On 15 May 2009, Huq began to present entertainment show Hannah-Oke on The Disney Channel with Duncan James. The show was a "Hannah Montana themed karaoke-style game show". Huq presented the seventh series of The Xtra Factor on ITV2, replacing Holly Willoughby who was unable to fulfil the role due to her ongoing commitments at This Morning.

In February 2011, Huq appeared in an episode of the ITV2 documentary programme Under Pressure, where she attempted to learn how to be a rapper. Trailers for the show asked "Will Konnie Huq it up?" She was coached by Akala and performed at indigO2.

For two consecutive years she presented the Royal Shakespeare Company's Live from Stratford upon Avon, a web project aimed at showing theatre productions in schools. In July 2012, the project web-streamed a performance of I, Cinna (The Poet), a play by Tim Crouch about the poet in Shakespeare's play Julius Caesar killed by a mob after being mistaken for a conspirator. In November 2013 a recording of the Globe Theatre production of Richard II was shown in 3,000 schools. The performances were followed by a question-and-answer session hosted by Huq.

In May 2022 the BBC announced that Huq would be one of the guest presenters to take over Richard Osman's role on Pointless.

Radio
On 15 September 2006, Huq became one of the presenters of The Tube with Tony Wilson, Alex James and Emily Rose on Channel 4 Radio working with production company UKoneFM. The first edition was broadcast on 3 November 2006. Huq made her debut as a news presenter on the BBC Asian Network in September 2007, in a series of documentaries on a radio current affairs programme called the Asian Network Report. She presented an episode of Archive on 4 in 2010, reviewing forty years of Sesame Street. In 2013, she took part in the Radio 4 biographical series Great Lives, where participants select someone who has inspired them, and chose Ada Lovelace.

Cameo appearances
She appeared as herself in The Kumars at No 42 in 2001. In 2007, she had minor roles in The Sarah Jane Adventures episode "Invasion of the Bane", and in the CBBC series M.I.High episode "The Big Freeze". She played herself again in the FM episode "Golden Lady" in March 2009. She played a villainous servant (also called Konnie) in the last episode of the second series of Robin Hood.

In 2013, Huq played a presenter of the fictional telethon "Help a Blameless Child" in television comedy series A Touch of Cloth. In 2019, she appeared briefly as a breakfast television presenter of the in-universe show Pam & Sam in Good Omens, which was based on the book written by Neil Gaiman and Terry Pratchett.

Screenwriting and conferences
In December 2009, Huq won the Best Rising Star Screenplay Angel award at the Monaco International Film Festival for her screenplay Ahmed and Mildred, a story described as "a superhero themed journey into the imagination of two young infants as they experience love at first sight." In March 2014, Ahmed and Mildred was selected as one of the projects to receive funding from Film London to enable production to take place.

She co-wrote the second episode of the Channel 4 anthology series Black Mirror, "Fifteen Million Merits", which is a satire of entertainment shows, with her husband Charlie Brooker. An installation featuring extracts from the episode was installed at the Barbican Centre as part of the science-fiction themed exhibition "Into the Unknown" in 2017.

On 14 October 2014, Huq was one of the speakers celebrating Ada Lovelace Day at the Royal Institution. On 29 June 2016, Huq hosted VOOM 2016, a pitch competition, for Virgin Media Business.

Children's books
Her book for children Cookie and the Most Annoying Boy in the World was published in 2019 and is the first of a projected three-book series. The book centres around the fictional character Cookie Haque, a schoolchild who enjoys learning about science, and what happens when her best friend moves away, and a boy that Cookie considers the most annoying boy in the world moves next door. Huq wrote and illustrated the book. The character of Cookie has been described by Huq as "a cross between Wimpy Kid and Bridget Jones." As of May 2020, the next book in the series, with a theme of climate change, was due to be published in August 2020.

Philanthropy

In 2005, Huq took part in the BBC One fundraising show Comic Relief Does Fame Academy. She was the third contestant to be voted off, after her rendition of Kim Wilde's Kids in America. She travelled to Uganda and met orphaned children on behalf of Comic Relief.

Huq travelled to Afghanistan with the charity Afghanaid to film a BBC Lifelines appeal, which was aired on 21 September 2008, and the following year she travelled to India as part of Rotary International's  "Thanks for Life/End Polio Now" campaign. She administered Polio vaccine to children as part of the trip.

As a celebrity ambassador for the British Red Cross, Huq appeared in the 2009 video "If I had HIV, would you kiss me?" which was part of a campaign against the stigmatisation of people living with HIV and AIDS. She was an ambassador for Gold Challenge, part of the official mass participation legacy programme for the London 2012 Olympic Games.

Personal life
On 26 July 2010, Huq married writer and satirist Charlie Brooker at the Little White Wedding Chapel in Las Vegas after a nine-month relationship. They have two sons. Huq has said she reduced her television commitments so that she could focus on her children.

Huq supported the Labour Party at the 2010 general election. Her sister, Rupa, was elected as the Labour MP for Ealing Central and Acton at the 2015 general election.

On 6 April 2008, Huq participated in the London leg of the Summer Olympics torch relay as one of 80 torch carriers on the torch's journey to Beijing. In Ladbroke Grove, a protester tried to grab the torch from her as she was about to hand it to the next runner. She was not hurt in the incident, though police wrestled the protester to the ground and arrested him.

Filmography

Bibliography

See also
 List of British Bangladeshis

References

External links

 
 
 Konnie Huq supports Dance for life British Red Cross
 Konnie Huq Guinness World Records Smashed Interview Sky 1

1975 births
Living people
People from Ealing
Alumni of Robinson College, Cambridge
English people of Bangladeshi descent
Television personalities from London
Writers from London
British Asian writers
English television writers
British women television writers
BBC Asian Network presenters
Blue Peter presenters
British radio presenters
British women radio presenters
Top of the Pops presenters
People educated at Notting Hill & Ealing High School